"Love Is the Seventh Wave" is a hit single from Sting's 1985 solo debut album The Dream of the Blue Turtles. It was released as the album's second single in the UK, and the third single in the US.

Song information

The song concludes with a brief, self-mocking reference to Sting's biggest hit song with The Police, "Every Breath You Take", which is about the dark side of love that leads to sexual jealousy and obsession.

Reception
Cash Box said that "the lilting rhythmic push and tropical melodic line...recalls Police-like efforts, but Branford Marsalis’ soprano sax coloring and the overall blending of instruments make this another appealing Sting solo success."  Billboard said that it integrates "reggae influence" with "jazz chops."

Music video
The music video portrays Sting as a primary school teacher (in fact, his day job before he became a rock star), who performs amidst his students' artwork.

The artwork was supplied by students at Latchmere Junior School, Kingston-upon-Thames, in the United Kingdom.

Single release
The single contains a different mix of the song from the album. It also features a live version of "Consider Me Gone", which was recorded at the Mogador Theatre in Paris in May 1985.

Track listings
7" US single (AM-2787)
 "Love Is the Seventh Wave" (Single Version) – 3:45
 "The Dream of the Blue Turtles" – 1:15

12" UK single (AMY 272)
 "Love Is the Seventh Wave" (New Mix) – 4:05
 "Consider Me Gone" (Live) – 4:45

12" US single (SP-12153)
 "Love Is the Seventh Wave" (New Mix) – 4:05
 "Fortress Around your heart" (Album Version) – 4:48
 "Dream of the blue turtles" – 1:15

Personnel 

 Sting – vocals, guitars, arrangements
 Darryl Jones – bass guitar
 Kenny Kirkland – keyboards
 Branford Marsalis – soprano saxophone, tenor saxophone, clarinet, percussion
 Dolette McDonald, Janice Pendarvis – backing vocals
 Omar Hakim – drums

Additional personnel 

 Danny Quatrochi – Synclavier, backing vocals
 Frank Opolko – trombone
 Pete Smith – backing vocals
 Elliot Jones – backing vocals
 Jane Alexander – backing vocals
 Vic Garbarini – backing vocals
 Pamela Quinlan – backing vocals
 The Nannies Chorus – backing vocals
 Rosemary Purt – backing vocals
 Stephanie Crewdson – backing vocals
 Joe Sumner – backing vocals
 Kate Sumner – backing vocals
 Michael Sumner – backing vocals

Charts

Weekly charts

Cover versions
The song was covered by Canadian band, The Duhks. It is a bonus track on their eponymous album, released in 2005.

References

Love Is the Seventh Wave

Sting (musician) songs
1985 singles
Songs written by Sting (musician)
A&M Records singles
1985 songs